In cetology, the study of whales and other cetaceans, a blowhole is the hole (or spiracle) at the top of the head through which the animal breathes air. In baleen whales, these are in pairs. It is homologous with the nostril of other mammals, and evolved via gradual movement of the nostrils to the top of the head. The posterior placement of blowholes on cetacean heads is believed to minimize the energy used when breathing at the water's surface. As whales reach the water surface to breathe, they forcefully expel air through the blowhole. The exhalation is released into the comparably lower-pressure, colder atmosphere, and any water vapor condenses. This spray, known as the blow, is often visible from far away as a white splash, which can also be caused by water resting on top of the blowhole.

Purpose and mechanism

Air sacs just below the blowhole allow whales to produce sounds for communication and, for toothed whales, echolocation. These air sacs are filled with air, which is then released again to produce sound in a similar fashion to releasing air from a balloon. When whales dive under water their nasal plug covers the nasal passage to the blowhole. The muscles controlling the nasal plug are relaxed during this time, but when the whale comes up for air these muscles contract and allow for the blowhole to be opened and the process of exhalation and inhalation to occur.

Baleen whales have two blowholes positioned in a V-shape while toothed whales have only one blowhole. The blowhole of a sperm whale, a toothed whale, is located left of centre in the frontal area of the snout, and is actually its left nostril, while the right nostril lacks an opening to the surface and its nasal passage is otherwise well developed.

References

External links
Whales don't spray water out of their blowholes, Gizmodo
 Whales of the World

Cetacean anatomy